Roger Federer defeated the defending champion Andy Roddick in the final, 7–5, 6–3 to win the men's singles tennis title at the 2004 Canadian Open.

Seeds

  Roger Federer (champion)
  Andy Roddick (final)
  Guillermo Coria (first round, retired due to a shoulder injury)
  Carlos Moyá (third round)
  Tim Henman (second round)
  David Nalbandian (first round)
  Juan Carlos Ferrero (first round, retired)
  Rainer Schüttler (first round)
  Lleyton Hewitt (third round)
  Andre Agassi (second round)
  Gastón Gaudio (first round)
  Sébastien Grosjean (first round)
  Nicolás Massú (first round)
  Paradorn Srichaphan (second round)
  Marat Safin (first round)
  Juan Ignacio Chela (third round)

Draw

Finals

Top half

Section 1

Section 2

Bottom half

Section 3

Section 4

External links
Association of Tennis Professionals (ATP) singles draw
Association of Tennis Professionals (ATP) qualifying draw

Canada Masters - Singles